The Metropolis of Moldavia and Bucovina, in Iași, Romania, is a metropolis of the Romanian Orthodox Church.

History

The Metropolis of Moldavia was set up in 1386, and recognized in 1401, by the Ecumenical Patriarchate of Constantinople. It then united, in 1872, with the Metropolis of Ungro-Wallachia to form the Romanian Orthodox Church.

Administration and structure

The church is headed by the Archbishop of Iași and Metropolitan of Moldavia and Bucovina, Teofan Savu.
It is divided into three archdioceses and one diocese.

Archdioceses and Archbishops
Archdiocese of Iași: Teofan Savu (2008-)
Archdiocese of Suceava and Rădăuți: Pimen Zainea (1991-)
Archdiocese of Roman and Bacău: Eftimie Luca (1978-)

Dioceses and Bishops
Diocese of Huși: Corneliu Onilă (2009-2017)

List of Metropolitans
 1401 Iosif Mușat
 1436-1447 Damian
 1447-1452 Ioachim
 1452-1477 Teoctist I
 1477-1508 Gheorghe I de Neamțu
 1509-1528 Teoctist II
 1528-1530 Calistrat
 1530-1546 Teofan I
 1546-1551 Grigorie Roșca
 1551-1552 Gheorghe II de Bistrița
 1552-1564 Grigorie II de la Neamț
 1564-1572 Teofan II
 1572-1577 Atanasie
 1578-1579 Teofan II
 .../...
 1582-1588 Teofan II
 1588-1591 Gheorghe III Movilă
 1591-1594 Nicanor
 1595-1600 Gheorghe III Movilă
 1600-1601 vacancy
 1601-1605 Gheorghe III Movilă
 1605-1608 Teodosie Barbovschi
 1608-1629 Anastasie Crimca
 1629-1632 Anastasie II
 1632-1653 Varlaam Moţoc
 1653-1659 Ghedeon
 1659-1666 Sava
.../...
 1670-1671 Ghedeon
 1671-1674 Dosoftei Bărilă
.../...
 1675-1686 Dosoftei Bărilă
 1686-1689 Calistrat Vartic
 1689-1701 Sava de la Roman
.../...
 1708-1722 Ghedeon
 1722-1730 Gheorghe IV
 1730-1740 Antonie 
 1740-1750 Nechifor
 1750-1760 Iacob Putneanul
 1761-1786 Gavriil Callimachi
 1786-1788 Leon Gheucă
 1788-1792 Ambrozie Serebrenicov
 1792-1803 Iacob Stamati 
 1803-1842 Veniamin Costache
.../...
 1851-1860 Sofronie Miclescu
 1865-1875 Calinic Miclescu
 1875-1902 Iosif Naniescu
 1902-1908 Partenie Clinceni
 1909-1934 Pimen Georgescu
 1934-1939 Nicodim Munteanu
 1939-1947 Irineu Mihălcescu
 1947-1948 Justinian Marina
 1948-1950 vacancy
 1950-1956 Sebastian Rusan
 1957-1977 Iustin Moisescu
 1977-1986 Teoctist Arăpașu 
 1986-1990 vacancy
 1990-2007 Daniel Ciobotea
 from 2008  Teofan Savu

See also
Iași Metropolitan Cathedral
Churches of Moldavia
Metropolis of Bessarabia

References

External links
 Official website

 
Moldavia
Bukovina
Religious organizations established in the 1380s